Live at Benaroya Hall is a two-disc live album by the American alternative rock band Pearl Jam, recorded on October 22, 2003 at Benaroya Hall, Seattle, Washington and released on July 27, 2004 through BMG.

Overview
The concert—which took place on October 22, 2003 at Benaroya Hall in Seattle, Washington—is acoustic, and was performed and released as a benefit for YouthCare, a non-profit charity in Seattle. The album was also released as a limited edition quadruple vinyl through Ten Club, Pearl Jam's fan club. Only 2,000 were pressed—each individually numbered by hand—and sold out within minutes of being on sale.

Live at Benaroya Hall was released through a one-album deal with BMG, and the band used the experiment to later sign with BMG subsidiary J Records to produce the album Pearl Jam (Avocado). It debuted at number 18 on the Billboard 200 chart and sold approximately 52,000 copies in its first week. As of April 2006, Live at Benaroya Hall has sold 168,000 copies in the United States according to Nielsen SoundScan.

Reception
AllMusic staff writer Jason Birchmeier gave the album two and a half out of five stars, writing, "Of the many, many live albums Pearl Jam publicly released, their October 23, 2003, show at Benaroya Hall is one of the more novel ones... Such novelty, of course, doesn't make Benaroya Hall an especially excellent set (in fact, it feels a little one-dimensional and subdued because of the acoustic instrumentation), though it is one of the more unique and interesting of the many, many shows Pearl Jam released publicly over the years." Rolling Stone staff writer Christian Hoard gave the album three out of five stars, writing that the " album's warm, wizened feel and unusual set list are appropriate for souvenir-collecting obsessives and lapsed fans looking for a new take on Pearl Jam's substantial catalog."

Track listing
Disc one
"Of the Girl" (Stone Gossard) – 5:22
"Low Light" (Jeff Ament) – 4:18
"Thumbing My Way" (Eddie Vedder) – 4:49
"Thin Air" (Gossard) – 4:25
"Fatal" (Gossard) – 3:49
"Nothing as It Seems" (Ament) – 7:29
"Man of the Hour" (Vedder) – 3:58
"Immortality" (Dave Abbruzzese, Ament, Gossard, Mike McCready, Vedder) – 6:18
"Off He Goes" (Vedder) – 5:53
"Around the Bend" (Vedder) – 5:37
"I Believe in Miracles" (Dee Dee Ramone, Daniel Rey) – 5:29
"Sleight of Hand" (Ament, Vedder) – 5:13
"All or None" (Gossard, Vedder) – 7:42
"Lukin" (Vedder) – 2:07

Disc two
"Parting Ways" (Vedder) – 5:24
"Down" (Gossard, McCready, Vedder) – 3:08
"Encore Break" – 0:49
"Can't Keep" (Vedder) – 3:15
"Dead Man" (Vedder) – 4:24
"Masters of War" (Bob Dylan) – 6:06
"Black" (Vedder, Gossard) – 7:41
"Crazy Mary" (Victoria Williams) – 7:40
"25 Minutes to Go" (Shel Silverstein) – 4:43
"Daughter" (Abbruzzese, Ament, Gossard, McCready, Vedder) – 6:30
"Encore Break" – 1:06
"Yellow Ledbetter" (Ament, McCready, Vedder) – 6:01

Personnel
Pearl Jam
Jeff Ament – bass guitar, double bass
Matt Cameron – drums
Stone Gossard – guitars
Mike McCready – guitars
Eddie Vedder – vocals, guitars, ukulele

Additional musicians and production
Ed Brooks at RFI CD Mastering – mastering
John Burton – recording
Brett Eliason – mixing
Boom Gaspar – Hammond B3, Fender Rhodes
Brad Klausen – design

Chart positions

References

External links
Live at Benaroya Hall information and lyrics at pearljam.com

Pearl Jam live albums
2004 live albums